Robert Fuchs (born 12 June 1991) is a Polish competitive rower.

He competed at the 2016 Summer Olympics in Rio de Janeiro, in the men's eight.

References

1991 births
Living people
Polish male rowers
Olympic rowers of Poland
Rowers at the 2016 Summer Olympics
Sportspeople from Gdańsk

World Rowing Championships medalists for Poland
21st-century Polish people